John Joseph O'Hagan (1930 – 2 November 2021) was a Gaelic football player and manager from Northern Ireland who played for club side Clonoe O'Rahilly's and at inter-county level with the Tyrone senior football team.

Career
Born in Coalisland, O'Hagan was a Gaelic footballer with nearby Clonoe O'Rahilly's GAC, with whom he won five Tyrone Senior Football Championship medals. A member of the Tyrone minor team that won the county’s first ever All-Ireland title in 1947, he helped the team to win another at this level in 1948. O'Hagan went on to share in the county’s breakthrough Ulster Championship senior wins in 1956 and 1957. When he retired from playing, he took up coaching and guided the Eglish St Patrick's club to the Tyrone Senior Championship title in 1970.

Personal life and death
His son, Damien O'Hagan, played at minor, under-21 and senior level for Tyrone, winning three Ulster senior medals and an All-Star award in 1986. 

O'Hagan died at the Craigavon Area Hospital on 2 November 2021.

Honours
Clonoe O'Rahilly's
Tyrone Senior Football Championship: 1958, 1959, 1960, 1964, 1965

Tyrone
Ulster Senior Football Championship: 1956, 1957
All-Ireland Minor Football Championship: 1947, 1948
Ulster Minor Football Championship: 1947, 1948

References

1930 births
2021 deaths
Tyrone inter-county Gaelic footballers
Gaelic football managers